= Dondedeo de' Giusti =

Genoese consul

Dondedeo de' Giusti was the Consul of Caffa, a colony of the Republic of Genoa in what is the current day city of Feodosia in Crimea, in 1343.
